The Cake of Light is the eucharistic host found within Thelema, the religion founded by British author and occultist Aleister Crowley in 1904 and some neo-Gnostic religions. A common "cake of light" contains kamut flour, honey, a few drops of Abramelin oil, olive oil, beeswing, ash, and sometimes particular bodily fluids such as semen, menstrual blood, vaginal fluids, or a mix therein (blood is frowned upon by most Gnostics), and is usually cooked in the shape of a small, flat wafer. It appears by name in two important Thelemic rituals: the Gnostic Mass and the Mass of the Phoenix.

Symbolism
The overall significance of the cakes is that it is considered to be a eucharist, a symbolic union between the microcosm, Man, and the macrocosm, the Divine; and the consumption of which completes a sacred circle, affirming an intimate connection between the two, which strengthens with each sacrament.

The Cakes of Light, traditionally composed of meal, honey, leavings of red wine lees, oil of Abramelin, olive oil and fresh blood as per the instructions in The Book of the Law is a perfume or incense but also a cake when baked.

Olive oil is considered a sacred oil by many cultures and religions of the world. It is also an ingredient in the making of Oil of Abramelin, and the olive noted by Aleister Crowley himself as "traditionally, the gift of Minerva, the Wisdom of God, the Logos".

Abramelin Oil was considered by Crowley to be representative of the "whole Tree of Life. The ten Sephiroth are blended into the perfect gold". Abramelin Oil is thus also a symbol of the Philosopher's Stone of the Alchemists.

In The Book of the Law
Cakes of Light are never mentioned by name in The Book of the Law, however many people interpret the following passages as being instructions for their creation:

Aleister Crowley described the Cakes of Light in his book Magick in Theory and Practice:

Various types of blood are given as acceptable within a Cake of Light. "Of the moon" refers to monthly menstrual blood. "Of a child" refers to fluid from sexual intercourse. "From the host of heaven" refers to semen. "Of enemies; then of the priest or of the worshippers" is self-explanatory. "Last of some beast" refers to animal blood; the least controversial since many foods are made with the substance. Although the first three options are used for their higher value (and notoriety), any option is acceptable. or can be formed from menstrual blood or semen.

Crowley thought it was important for magicians to perform a eucharistic ritual of some kind daily: 

A Eucharist of some sort should most assuredly be consummated daily by every magician, and he should regard it as the main sustenance of his magical life. It is of more importance than any other magical ceremony, because it is a complete circle. The whole of the force expended is completely re-absorbed; yet the virtue is that vast gain represented by the abyss between Man and God.

The magician becomes filled with God, fed upon God, intoxicated with God. Little by little his body will become purified by the internal lustration of God; day by day his mortal frame, shedding its earthly elements, will become in very truth the Temple of the Holy Ghost. Day by day matter is replaced by Spirit, the human by the divine; ultimately the change will be complete; God manifest in flesh will be his name.

See also
 Body of light
 Sefer HaRazim
Religious consumption of blood

References

Citations

Works cited
 
 
 

Thelema
Light and religion
Religious food and drink
Eucharistic objects